The EMD FP10 was a series of rebuilt F-unit locomotives originally operated on the MBTA Commuter Rail system.

History
The FP10 units were rebuilt in the late 1970s by the Illinois Central Gulf Railroad at its Paducah, Kentucky shops for the Massachusetts Bay Transportation Authority using former Gulf, Mobile and Ohio Railroad F3 and F7 units. These F3 and F7 locomotives were used by the GM&O and ICG (for a short period) in Chicago-area commuter service and later in freight service until their retirement. Despite their designation, the FP10s locomotives were not the linear successors of the FP9. 

The rebuilding by ICG saw all of the units gain full-length stainless steel air intake grilles, which in many cases replaced the 'chicken wire' appearance which many had during their tenure with the GM&O and ICG. They were also equipped with a 480 V HEP generator at the rear of the locomotive, as well as dynamic brakes, and had their classification lights replaced with large red marker lights which enabled the locomotive to "carry the markers" when operating in push mode.

Unlike the FP7 and FP9, the FP10 units were never extended beyond their original length, thus making the "P" in their designation misleading. The FP10 designation, like that of the GP10 (also an ICG product) was conceived by ICG and was never sanctioned by EMD, though railroads and rail enthusiasts alike agree on the moniker.

The FP10 locomotives were painted in the MBTA's purple, silver, and yellow scheme, wearing two variations (one which had two substantial yellow swaths on the nose, and the second which used the yellow only as striping on the nose, as well as the rest of the carbody) of the transit agency's dress. At least one was painted in a scheme that was a "negative" of the conventional scheme, where purple was the primary color and silver taking a secondary role.

During the early 1990s, the FP10s were retired by the MBTA, with four being sold to the Metro-North Commuter Railroad (MNCR 410-413), some leased (Cape Cod Central—and eventually resold after that operation ceased) and others being scrapped. In late 1999/early 2000, the last remaining MBTA-owned FP10 units were sold and have operated in Maryland, New Orleans, Georgia, and Idaho on various tourist trains.

Surviving units
Unit 1101 now resides at the Gold Coast Railroad Museum in Miami, Florida, painted as Seaboard Coast Line Railroad No. 4033
Unit 1151, later MNCR 412, was sold to the Adirondack Railroad and now operates as their 1502
Unit 1152, later MNCR 413, survives at the Danbury Railway Museum in Danbury, Connecticut.
Unit 1153 is on display at the Edaville Railroad in Carver, Massachusetts

See also
 List of GM-EMD locomotives

References

B-B locomotives
Electro-Motive Division locomotives
Illinois Central locomotives
MBTA Commuter Rail
Diesel-electric locomotives of the United States
Rebuilt locomotives
Standard gauge locomotives of the United States